Padmanabhan Subramanian Poti (2 February 1923 – February 1998) was a former Chief Justice of the Kerala and Gujarat High Courts in India.
After retiring he assisted the Indian People's Tribunal on Environment and Human Rights (IPT).

Career

Poti was born on 2 February 1923 at Trivandrum in Kerala.
He studied at the University College Trivandrum, graduating with a degree in Science.
He then attended the Government Law College Thiruvananthapuram where he earned a B.L. degree.
In September 1945 he became an Advocate in what was then the High Court of Travancore.

Poti started his career as a junior to U.P. Kakkillya, Advocate General of the State and later Chief Justice.
Between 1957 and 1960 he worked part-time for the government of Kerala as a  Law Officer in Taxes.
From 1966 to 1970 he served on the Kerala Law Academy as a member of the Executive Committee.
From 1967 to 1969 he was a member of the Kerala University faculty of law, and as Advocate General of Kerala
was chairman of the Kerala Bar Council.
In 1969 P.S. Poti was appointed a judge in the Kerala High Court. 
In January 1981 he became Acting Chief Justice and in June 1983 was confirmed as permanent Chief Justice of the high court of Kerala.
In August 1983 he was transferred to Gujarat as Chief Justice.

Major rulings

P.S. Poti made several significant judgments in favor of the rights of poor people fighting for justice.
In January 1985 P.S. Poti gave judgement on an application for government benefits by the families of mill workers who had died while the mills where they worked were closed.
The government was arguing that the workers had in effect been dismissed, and were refusing to pay.  P.S. Poti said "Merely enacting laws would not be an adequate protection or extension of a necessary benefit.  Such laws have to be implemented with a sense of commitment". He found the government liable to pay, liable for all costs and directed the government to pay interest at 12% on the unpaid monies.

P.S. Poti pointed out in 1985 that although the original Indian Constitution prohibits discrimination, an amendment in 1951 empowers the state to make reservation in favor of any disadvantaged group.  The question of the legality of reservations for tribal people, scheduled castes, women and other groups is therefore not an issue, assuming the groups are considered disadvantaged.
In 1985 P.S. Poti heard a petition from the tribal people of nineteen villages in Gujarat whose land was being flooded by the Sardar Sarovar project.
The government claimed it had the right to arbitrarily evict the people.
Poti would not rule on the legal issue. He said the matter should be settled out of court and the villagers should receive full compensation.

Post-retirement

After retirement P.S. Poti served on the Indian People's Human Rights Tribunal which investigated the Chintapalli Arson Case, where police had destroyed tribal hamlets in Visakhapatnam district of Andhra Pradesh.
The tribunal released a report on 18 October 1988.
The report indicted the policemen responsible for the crime and the AP government for their forest and tribal policy.
In 1989 he was elected president of the All-India Lawyers Union.

In 1990 the national government led by the Janata Dal appointed P.S. Poti and P.A. Rosha, a retired officer of the Indian Police Service, to a committee to investigate the events of the 1984 anti-Sikh riots in Delhi.  Sajjan Kumar had been accused of being involved in inciting the violence.
The Poti-Rosha Committee examined more than 1,000 affidavits.  30 cases were recommended for prosecution.
The Central Bureau of Investigation tried to arrest Kumar, but he secured anticipatory bail. 
Both members of the panel resigned in October 1990.

In 1994 the Indian People's Tribunal investigated the Rajaji National Park, where the authorities wanted to remove the Gujjars who had traditionally lived in the forest. The tribunal met forest officials, scientists, NGO staff and the Gujjars. 
P.S. Poti prepared the IPT report, which recommended that the Gujjars be allowed to stay but assisted if they decided to leave. This would require a change to the laws, which specified that no humans could live in a national park.
Justice Poti interviewed the many stakeholders, showed the complexity of the issues, and showed that moving the residents out of the forest would not guarantee its survival.
His report on the Rajaji National Park provided a model for similar investigations of other protected areas in India.

Padmanabhan Subramanian Poti died in Kochi, Kerala in February 1998 of a heart attack.

References

Sources

 Pdf.

1998 deaths
1923 births
Justices of the Supreme Court of India
Advocates General for Indian states
Chief Justices of the Kerala High Court
Chief Justices of the Gujarat High Court
20th-century Indian judges
20th-century Indian lawyers